This is a list of airlines of Alberta which have an air operator's certificate issued by Transport Canada, the country's civil aviation authority. These are airlines that are based in Alberta.

Current airlines

Defunct airlines

References

Alberta
Aviation in Alberta
Airlines